Cappy Ricks Returns is a 1935 American comedy film directed by Mack V. Wright and written by George Waggner. The film stars Robert McWade, Ray Walker, Florine McKinney, Lucien Littlefield, Bradley Page and Lois Wilson. The film was released on September 25, 1935, by Republic Pictures.

Plot

Cast
Robert McWade as Alden 'Cappy' Ricks
Ray Walker as Bill Peck
Florine McKinney as Barbara Blake
Lucien Littlefield as Skinner
Bradley Page as Spencer Winton
Lois Wilson as Florry Peasley
Oscar Apfel as T. Osgood Blake
Kenneth Harlan as Matt Peasley

References

External links
 

1935 films
American comedy films
1935 comedy films
Republic Pictures films
Films directed by Mack V. Wright
American black-and-white films
1930s English-language films
1930s American films